The name Shava may refer to:

King Shava, king in Hindu mythology
Sceafa, king in English mythology
Shava (band), Finnish Bhangra band that released its first album in 2010
Andrei Arshavin (born 1981), Russian football player